Castlevania is an American adult animated dark fantasy action horror television series made for the streaming service Netflix and is produced by Frederator Studios' Kevin Kolde and Fred Seibert. Based on the Japanese video game series of the same name by Konami, the first two seasons adapt the 1989 entry Castlevania III: Dracula's Curse and follow Trevor Belmont, Alucard and Sypha Belnades as they defend the nation of Wallachia from Dracula and his minions. Additionally, characters and elements from the 2005 entry Castlevania: Curse of Darkness are featured beginning in the second season, and Alucard's backstory is drawn from Castlevania: Symphony of the Night. The art style is heavily influenced by Japanese animation and Ayami Kojima's artwork.

Castlevania was originally planned as a film, developed by producer Kevin Kolde and his company Project 51. He joined Frederator Studios in 2005, and founder Fred Seibert agreed to produce the project there. They contracted a script with writer Warren Ellis in 2007. The project entered development hell until about 2015, and it was picked up by streaming service Netflix. Powerhouse Animation Studios joined the team and production commenced. The production team includes staff members who worked in the Japanese anime industry.

The series premiered on Netflix on July 7, 2017, and was renewed for an expanded second season of eight episodes on the same day; the second season premiered on October 26, 2018. A ten-episode third season was greenlit by Netflix and released on March 5, 2020. The series ended with the release of its fourth season on May 13, 2021. The series received critical acclaim, with its visuals, animation, voice acting, action sequences, characterization, themes and writing receiving much praise, although the pacing, particularly of the third and fourth seasons, garnered a polarized response.

A follow-up series in the Castlevania setting, Castlevania: Nocturne, is in the works at Netflix which will focus on Richter Belmont, a descendant of Trevor and Sypha, and Maria Renard during the French Revolution.

Premise 
When his human wife is burned at the stake after being falsely accused of witchcraft, the vampire Count Vlad Dracula Țepeș declares all the people of Wallachia will pay with their lives. He summons an army of demons which overruns the country, causing the people to live lives of fear and distrust. To combat this, the outcast monster hunter Trevor Belmont takes up arms against Dracula's forces, aided by the magician Sypha Belnades and Dracula's dhampir son Alucard.

Voice cast

Introduced in Season 1
 Richard Armitage as Trevor Belmont, the last living member of the Belmont clan, an excommunicated family of monster hunters.
 James Callis as Adrian "Alucard" Țepeș, the dhampir son of Dracula and Lisa Țepeș, who seeks to protect humanity from his father
 Graham McTavish as Vlad Dracula Țepeș, a vampire who swears vengeance on humanity for the murder of his wife Lisa, summoning an army of monsters to kill all the people of Wallachia (seasons 1–2, 4; no lines in season 3)
 Alejandra Reynoso as Sypha Belnades, a Speaker Magician and the Elder's granddaughter who wields powerful elemental magic.
 Tony Amendola as The Elder, Sypha's grandfather and the leader of a group of Speakers aiding the people of Gresit whom Trevor befriends. (season 1; no lines in season 2)
 Matt Frewer as the Bishop, a corrupt clergyman who orders the burning of Lisa Țepeș for witchcraft, later being named the bishop of Gresit (seasons 1–2)
 Emily Swallow as Lisa Țepeș, Dracula's beloved wife who is burned at the stake in Târgoviște after being falsely accused of witchcraft (seasons 1–2, 4; no lines in season 3)

Introduced in Season 2
 Theo James as Hector, a devil forgemaster called upon to serve Dracula in his war against humanity. (seasons 2–4)
 Adetokumboh M'Cormack as Isaac, a rivalrous devil forgemaster and fierce loyalist of Dracula who helps to lead his army. (seasons 2–4)
 Jaime Murray as Carmilla, a scheming vampire mistress and member of Dracula's war council who seeks to usurp him, leader of the Council of Sisters. (seasons 2–4)
 Peter Stormare as Godbrand, a Viking vampire warlord called upon to serve Dracula in the battle against Wallachia. (season 2)

Introduced in Season 3
 Jessica Brown Findlay as Lenore, the diplomat member of the Council of Sisters. (seasons 3–4)
 Rila Fukushima as Sumi, a vampire hunter from Japan using a sword. (season 3; corpse in season 4)
 Jason Isaacs as The Judge, the town leader of Lindenfeld who wishes to keep peace and order in town, at all costs. (season 3)
 Yasmine Al Massri as Morana, the strategist member of the Council of Sisters. (seasons 3–4)
 Ivana Miličević as Striga, the military member of the Council of Sisters. (seasons 3–4)
 Navid Negahban as Sala, the leader of the monks of Lindenfeld. (season 3)
 Bill Nighy as Saint Germain, a strange man researching a realm known as the Infinite Corridor. (seasons 3–4)
 Toru Uchikado as Taka, a vampire hunter from Japan using a bow. (season 3; corpse in season 4)
 Gildart Jackson as FlysEyes, a demon created by Isaac. (seasons 3–4)
 Lance Reddick as The Captain, a pirate captain who befriends and helps Isaac. (season 3)
 Barbara Steele as Miranda, an old woman possessing magic powers who helps Isaac. (season 3)

Introduced in Season 4
 Malcolm McDowell as Varney, an egotistical vampire from London and former agent from Dracula's Army who seeks to resurrect his master.  (season 4)
 Toks Olagundoye as Zamfir, the head guard of Targoviste's Underground Court, fighting against night creatures. (season 4)
 Marsha Thomason as Greta of Danesti, a swordswoman of Carthaginian descent and the head woman of Danesti, fighting against night creatures. (season 4)
 Titus Welliver as Ratko, a brutal Slavic vampire warrior assisting Varney. (season 4)
 Christine Adams as The Alchemist, a powerful mage who resides in the Infinite Corridor and controls it. (season 4)
 Matthew Waterson as Dragan, a vampire warrior who seeks to resurrect Dracula. (season 4)

Episodes

Season 1 (2017)

Season 2 (2018)

Season 3 (2020)

Season 4 (2021)

Production 

In March 2007, Frederator Studios acquired the rights to produce an animated film adaption of Castlevania III: Dracula's Curse, intended as a direct-to-video production. Frederator brought writer Warren Ellis aboard as the screenwriter for the series. In an interview with Paste, Warren Ellis said that when he was contacted about Castlevania he had no previous knowledge of the series and discovered it was a "Japanese transposition of the Hammer Horror films I grew up with and loved". Ellis explained how he worked with Castlevania producer Koji Igarashi to fit the film into the timeline of the series, including writing a new backstory, and how he was frustrated that Igarashi wanted eight full re-writes of pre-production material before giving approval. Ellis noted that Frederator's Kevin Kolde, who was slated to produce the work, did not want the film to be aimed at children, allowing Ellis to use gruesome imagery and scenes as necessary to tell the story he wanted to write, something that Ellis had found restrictive in working with normal television animation.

In adapting the game for the film, Ellis did not want to make a point-for-point adaption, but instead provide some material to flesh out the game's world and elements behind it. At this stage, the film was anticipated to be only 80 minutes long, which Ellis knew would not be enough to tell the full story he wanted, so was able to break apart his script into a trilogy of works, each part having a self-contained three-act structure; the first part would be to introduce the characters of Dracula, Trevor, Sypha, and Alucard and with a meaningful narrative resolution. In this manner, Ellis noted that if the other two parts were never greenlit, the first work "doesn't demand the presence of the other two parts for it to work as its own thing". Due to the limited time, Ellis opted to drop Grant Danasty, a pirate character in the game; Ellis noted that besides "the stupid name", he felt the pirate was misplaced in the setting and that the limited run time would not allow him to develop the character fully.

Sometime around 2008, work on the production stalled, and entered development hell. Ellis had completed his script in June 2008, and the show's production blog had said in August 2008 that they were shopping around the idea as a theatrical release, but no further updates followed before the blog was quietly deleted.

Around 2012, Adi Shankar was approached to direct a live-action version of Ellis' script. Shankar, who at the time had just finished work as executive producer of Dredd, said that the party was looking to make a film in the style of the Underworld films with a similar budget, representative of a small studio with large independent backing. Shankar turned the opportunity down, saying it felt "250 percent wrong", as he had deep respect for the original game and felt the live-action version would not treat it well. Following this, Shankar stepped back from Hollywood to pursue more self-published works, stating that "the major studios were blatantly disrespecting fandom" as a reason he turned down the offer.

The show was revitalized when Powerhouse Animation Studios's Sam Deats was able to negotiate a deal with Netflix for the production, using the existing scripts that had been written nearly a decade prior. Powerhouse reached out to Frederator to help with the show's production. According to Ellis, Netflix was very positive about his original scripts that he wrote in 2007, and so he had to only make a few changes to fit the Netflix format while staying true to the version of the script Konami had accepted. Shankar was approached with the opportunity to produce the work, which he took as neither Powerhouse or Frederator sought to restrict his creative vision from Ellis' scripts. Fred Seibert and Kevin Kolde of Frederator Studios also co-produce. The series was animated by Frederator Studios and Powerhouse Animation Studios and directed by Sam Deats. Trevor Morris composed the show's music.

The show's art style was heavily influenced by the work Ayami Kojima did for Castlevania: Symphony of the Night. They also took ideas from director Satoshi Kon's works for character expressions and series such as Cowboy Bebop, Demon Slayer and Berserk for inserting humor among the more serious elements. The show is produced using 2D hand-drawn animation, taking cues from Ninja Scroll and Vampire Hunter D, with staff members that previously worked on Vampire Hunter D: Bloodlust. The manga series Berserk and Blade of the Immortal were also cited as inspiration, with one of the show's animation directors having previously worked on the Berserk films. The production works closely with Konami, the holders of the Castlevania franchise, who helped to identify small continuity issues but were otherwise very receptive towards the work.

The first season represents the first part of the trilogy that Ellis has laid out in 2007. Ellis said that the second season, completing the trilogy, is where he had been able to deviate somewhat from the game, and has been better anticipate the show's release on Netflix in terms of scenes and episode lengths. Shankar believes that there is an opportunity for more stories to be told borrowing from other games in the series, noting that overall he sees the series as "a story about a family and multiple generations of this family" with many tales to draw from. The production team for the second season included staff members who worked on Madhouse productions such as Death Parade.

Developing the character of Dracula, Adi Shankar made it clear that one of the series' main goals has been to paint Dracula not as a villain, but a tragic, doomed figure. According to him: "The best villains, in general, are the heroes of their own story and the trick to making Castlevania resonate was this idea that Dracula isn't a bad guy, he isn't a villain, he's just a person consumed with darkness. That first episode in Season 1 we start to see why he wants to eradicate humans. He's not just this mustache-curling, one-dimensional villain. What Dracula is doing is not really a war against humanity. It's more a suicide note."

The show's third season was greenlit by Netflix a few days after the broadcast of the second season. Shankar announced in November 2018 that he will also be leading an animated series based on Capcom's Devil May Cry, which he acquired the rights for himself, and will make the show, alongside the Castlevania series, part of a shared "Bootleg Multiverse". On March 27, 2020, Netflix announced they had renewed the series for a fourth season, stating on April 16, 2021, that it would be the series's final season. On July 31, 2020, it was reported that amid a wave of sexual misconduct allegations being levelled against the show's creator and showrunner Warren Ellis, he would no longer have any involvement in developing subsequent Castlevania series after the fourth season's release.

Release 
Castlevanias first season of four 30-minute episodes was released on July 7, 2017. The second season is eight episodes long and was released on October 26, 2018. The third season was released on March 5, 2020. The show's fourth and final season was released on May 13, 2021.

Reception

Audience viewership 
According to Parrot Analytics, Castlevania was the most popular digital original series in the United States during July 619, 2017, with the show generating 23,175,616 "demand expressions" on average. According to Parrot Analytics, "demand expressions" indicate the "total audience demand being expressed for a title, within a country," measured by video streams and downloads as well as social media.

It remained the seventh most in-demand digital original show in the United States through October 11, 2017. By the end of 2017, Castlevania was the year's 15th most in-demand digital original series in the United States, averaging 18,137,196 demand expressions throughout the year. It was also one of the year's top20 most in-demand digital original series in the United Kingdom (20th), Japan (4th), Brazil (10th), Mexico (11th), France (13th), Canada (14th), Germany (19th) and Australia (20th).

By the time the second season became available in 2018, Castlevania had reportedly garnered nearly 30million viewers worldwide according to Netflix analytics, becoming one of the most successful original animated shows on Netflix.

Critical response 

The review aggregation website Rotten Tomatoes reported that 82% of critics have given the first season a positive review based on 28 reviews, with an average rating of 7.61/10. The site's critics consensus reads, "Castlevania offers spectacular visuals and a compelling adaptation in its all-too-short first season." It is the first video game adaptation in the site's history to receive a "Fresh" rating. Metacritic, which assigns a rating out of 100 to reviews from mainstream critics, reported that there were "generally favorable reviews" for the first season, with an weighted average score of 71 based on 6 reviews. Dave Trumbore of Collider gave the series four stars out of five, praising the chemistry between the cast and comparing the violence with anime such as Ninja Scroll. Several reviews lauded the voice cast, particularly Graham McTavish as Dracula and Richard Armitage as Trevor Belmont. IGN also wrote glowingly of Warren Ellis's script, but felt some of his humor was a little jarring. The Verge gave a mixed review, noting that the gore did little to create a sense of danger and felt "intentionally flashy". It concluded that "Castlevania is ripe with potential, but also burdened with clichés." Dan Seitz at Uproxx left a negative review, writing that it tried too hard to find profundity in the story of the Castlevania series. He also cited issues with the pacing.

Rotten Tomatoes reported that 100% of critics gave the second season a positive review with an average rating of 9.3/10, based on 15 reviews. The critics consensus reads, "Castlevania sinks its fangs into vampiric lore during a devilishly fun second season that benefits from an expanded sense of scale and episode tally that allows the series to fully spread its leathery wings." IGN gave the second season a score of 9.2/10, praising Ellis's approach to Castlevania as "witty and self-aware enough to poke fun at itself when necessary". In Collider's review for the second series, Dave Trumbore mentioned there "isn't a weak link in the cast here". Complaints were made towards the pacing and the screen time spent on Dracula's court in season two. Writing for GameSpot, Michael Rougeau was disappointed that Trevor's group spent the majority of their time in a library, and also said Dracula "does literally nothing in all the episodes we've seen so far. There's one medium length flashback in which he massacres a council of merchants who offended him, but it's not like that moves the story along". Rougeau concluded that the action was creatively executed, but he felt that the new cast was given more development and that the previous characters were left to "tread water". Film School Rejects echoed similar sentiments, who said the second season was more of a complement to the first one. McTavish and the rest of the voice cast were once again met with high praise.

The third season was also well received, with 95% of critics on Rotten Tomatoes giving a positive review with an average rating of 7.99/10, based on 19 reviews. The critics consensus reads, "Castlevania stunningly animated third season continues to build on the game's lore by diving deeper into its characters with humor, heart, and a lot of bloody action." Collider's Dave Trumbore gave the third season a glowing review, praising the action and declaring the show "one of the best video game adaptations ever made". This was echoed by IGN, who touted the show as "the best video game adaptation around". Ellis' approach to the source material and the voice cast remained points of particular praise.

The fourth season was positively received as well, with an approval rating of 100% on Rotten Tomatoes with an average score of 8.90/10, based on 12 reviews. IGN commended the series' ability to deliver a satisfying ending without feeling rushed. The animation as well as the voice cast were once again praised. Paul Tassi, writing for Forbes, criticized the pacing in the beginning of the season, but concluded that season four was "excellent" and "a full return to form for the series" after a mixed third season.

Sequel 
Netflix announced in May 2021 that a new series with a new cast of characters set in the Castlevania universe was being planned, but that it would not be a direct spin-off of the original Castlevania series. Instead, it will focus on Richter Belmont, Trevor and Sypha's descendant, and Maria Renard, set during the French Revolution. On August 18, 2021, it was reported that Adi Shankar is suing Netflix and Kevin Kolde for excluding him from the spin-off and a breach of contract. During Netflix's 2022 Geeked Week virtual event, it was announced that the series is titled Castlevania: Nocturne.

Notes

References

External links

Frederator Networks, Inc. page
Powerhouse Animation page

2010s American adult animated television series
2010s American drama television series
2010s American horror television series
2010s American supernatural television series
2020s American adult animated television series
2020s American drama television series
2020s American horror television series
2020s American supernatural television series
2017 American television series debuts
2018 American television seasons
2020 American television seasons
2021 American television seasons
2021 American television series endings
American action adventure television series
American adult animated action television series
American adult animated adventure television series
American adult animated drama television series
American adult animated fantasy television series
American adult animated horror television series
Animated series based on video games
Animated television series by Netflix
Anime-influenced animation
Anime-influenced Western animation
Anime-influenced Western animated television series
Castlevania
Dark fantasy television series
Demons in television
Dracula television shows
English-language Netflix original programming
Frederator Studios
Gothic horror television series
Mass murder in fiction
Patricide in fiction
Religious drama television series
Television series set in the 15th century
Television shows set in Europe
Vampires in animated television
Viz Media anime
Witchcraft in television
Works based on Konami video games
Works by Warren Ellis
Works set in the 1450s
Works set in the 1470s